Elizabeth Dhuey is a Canadian economist specializing in the economics of education. She is an Associate Professor of Economics at the University of Toronto Scarborough and Chairwoman of the Canadian Women Economists Committee through the Canadian Economics Association.

Education and work 
Elizabeth Dhuey earned her B.A. in economics and sociology from the University of Colorado Boulder in 1999, before earning an M.A (2002) and PhD (2007) in economics at the University of California, Santa Barbara. Upon graduation, Dhuey was appointed to the position of Assistant Professor of Economics in the Department of Management at the University of Toronto Scarborough in 2007. In 2014, she was promoted to the position of Associate Professor of Economics. She holds cross-appointments with the Department of Economics, the Munk School of Global Affairs and Public Policy, and the Institute of Health Policy, Management and Evaluation at the University of Toronto.

In addition to her academic work, Dhuey held the role of President of the Canadian Women Economist Network in 2018. Appointed in 2017 for a four-year term, she is the current Chairwoman of the Canadian Women Economists Committee, a standing committee of the Canadian Economics Association. Dhuey has been a research fellow with the Behavioural Economics in Action at Rotman Centre (BEAR) at the Rotman School of Management since 2016.

Notable contributions 
Dhuey’s research focuses on the economics of education. She is a significant contributor to knowledge on topics such as the developmental effects of education system organization on young children and necessary policy considerations for the state funding of special education programs.

Research on the effects of education system organization on child development  
In a forthcoming paper with David Figlio, Krzysztof Karbownik and Jeffrey Roth, Dhuey takes an empirical approach in understanding the disadvantages faced by children based on their age of entry to primary school, specifically those that are the youngest of their group. This is in response to the increase in redshirting of kindergarten students, based on the supposed benefits from delaying entry to schooling such as increased cognitive development, stronger interpersonal skills, and better professional outcomes down the road. To test the effects that being the youngest or oldest of an age cohort can have in developmental outcomes, Dhuey et al. implement a regression discontinuity design within families that have children born in August and in September: these birth months correspond to being immediately before and after the average age cutoff time for school entrance. Dhuey et al. find significant positive developmental outcomes for September-born students over their August-born classmates. Notable differences in outcomes are also present in receiving disability status, while test scores and high school graduation rates are similar across the oldest and youngest students. On the end of policy considerations, they find that summer school can exacerbate age of entry effects while smaller first grade classrooms can lessen age of entry effects.

Published in 2013, Dhuey conducted research on the differing academic achievements in students who attended a middle school versus those who attended a school from kindergarten that led directly into high school. This look at the effects of grade-level configuration used a sample of student outcomes, in the form of test scores, from the Canadian province of British Columbia. The results showed that middle school attendance negatively affected math and reading scores at the grade 7 level when compared to scores for students who attended grade 7 within a primary school, disproportionately so for students on the lower half of the test score distribution. The importance of this research is highlighted through grade reform being a relatively inexpensive policy measure in improving education outcomes, and one that comes with a high level of control at the district level.

Research on policy considerations relating to educational program funding 
In an analysis of select financial education policy in 2011, Dhuey looks at the individuals and groups most likely to benefit from new state subsidization of kindergarten programs in the United States. The subsidization resulted in increases in access to and enrollment in kindergarten, and subsequently reduced the probability of students being below grade for their age: primarily so for low-income children.

Dhuey and Lipscomb look at the census funding model for special education programs within the United States in a 2011 report on its advantages and disadvantages. Under the Individuals with Disabilities Education Act (IDEA), federal and state governments subsidize up to 62% of the additional costs needed to support learners with disabilities, while districts cover the rest. One method of allocation for support funding is census funding; census funding bases allocation decisions on total district enrollment and offers a fixed amount per student. Census funding does not consider factors such as the number of students with disabilities within a district or the extent of their disabilities. Census funding reduces fiscal incentives for districts to over-identify disabilities, and also offers benefits in its ease of application, transparency and ability to be modified. A major disadvantage with census funding is the underlying assumption that special education needs per student are uniform, despite multiple studies showing that disability rates are most often unevenly distributed; additionally, census funding does not consider potential differences in the proportion of students with disabilities per district. Based on these considerations among others, Dhuey and Lipscomb suggest the use of a weighted-student formula to account for factors such as poverty and high-cost disabilities that affect the distribution of special education needs, and that efforts for cost-effective program delivery are initiated to avoid the risk of having districts  exhaust their state funding and sacrifice program quality as a result.

Research on the role of school principals in educational outcomes 
With Smith in 2014, Dhuey looks at the role that high-quality school principals can play in increasing student achievement, through the measure of math and reading test scores in British Columbia, Canada. Principal quality is measured through the characteristics of the policies they implement, addressing areas such as class size, student assessment and teacher allocation. Control measures are implemented for principal tenure and experience to minimize indirect effects stemming from the continuing activity of principals past their term at previous schools. Their results indicate that a one standard deviation increase in principal quality leads to a 0.289-0.408 standard deviation increase in student achievement. The implication of their findings is that the identification of quality principals and subsequent dispersion of them across schools can play a significant role in reducing gaps in performance across students.

In a 2018 paper co-authored with Smith, Dhuey continues her research in this area by estimating the value that principals provide to student achievement from a sample of primary school students in North Carolina. The results indicate that principals are able to add considerable value to student achievement through test scores, primarily based on the match between schools and principals. Similar to the previous study, the findings of this paper indicate that gaps in student achievement can be addressed by allocating high-quality principals where they are needed.

Media appearances and contributions 
Dhuey's work has contributed to discussions on the economics of education across a number of print and digital media publications.

Dhuey's findings on the considerable advantages for older children in classroom environments, and the rise of academic redshirting, is cited in pieces published in the Wall Street Journal, the Toronto Star and Slate. The 2008 novel Outliers: The Story of Success by Malcolm Gladwell also features her work on this topic. Dhuey's research appeared in a 2014 article for Maclean’s on a rise in ADHD diagnosis rates, discussing the pressures that motivate ADHD diagnoses. She has also been featured in the New York Times, Parents Magazine and Today.

Selected publications 

Dhuey, Elizabeth. (2011) "Who Benefits from Kindergarten? Evidence from the Introduction of State Subsidization." Educational Evaluation and Policy Analysis, 33(1), 3-22. article doi:10.3102/0162373711398125

References 

Year of birth missing (living people)
Living people
Canadian economists
Canadian women economists
University of California, Santa Barbara alumni
University of Colorado Boulder alumni
Academic staff of the University of Toronto Scarborough